The  is an electric multiple unit (EMU) train type operated by the private railway operator Sanyo Electric Railway in Japan since 1986.

Formation
The trains are formed as four-car and six-car sets.

Refurbished set
The refurbished set is formed as follows.

The M cars 5802 and 5252 are fitted with pantographs.

Interior
The interior consists of semi-transverse seating. The interior of the refurbished sets consists of longitudinal seating in the cars 1, 2, 5 and 6, and transverse seating in the cars 3 and 4.

Technical specifications
The trains have aluminium alloy bodies, and direct current motors with field-added-excitation control. During refurbishment the controls of car 2 were changed to IGBT/SiC Hybrid module-VFD.

History
The trains entered service in 1986. A total of 60 vehicles were built by Kawasaki Heavy Industries until 1995.

Refurbishment
Refurbishment began in 2018. Modifications include changes in the exterior design, a modified interior with wheelchair and stoller spaces, and IGBT/SiC Hybrid module-VVVF inverter control in car 2. The number of motored cars was reduced from four to three per six-car set. The first refurbished set entered service on October 30, 2018.

Special liveries
Set 5020 entered service in a special wrapping as part of the  campaign on March 3, 2009.
Set 5010 entered service in a special wrapping as part of the  campaign on June 5, 2017.
Set 5008 entered service in a -themed wrapping on July 2, 2017.

References

External links

Sanyo Electric Railway news release 

Electric multiple units of Japan
Kawasaki multiple units
1500 V DC multiple units of Japan